Acqua Vergine is one of several Roman aqueducts that deliver pure drinking water to Rome.  Its name derives from its predecessor Aqua Virgo, which was constructed by Marcus Vipsanius Agrippa in 19 BC. Its terminal castellum is located at the Baths of Agrippa, and it served the vicinity of Campus Martius through its various conduits. In an effort to restore fresh water to Rome during the Renaissance, Pope Nicholas V, in 1453, renovated the main channels of the Aqua Virgo and added numerous secondary conduits under Campo Marzio. The original terminus, called a mostra, which means showpiece, was the stately, dignified wall fountain designed by Leon Battista Alberti in Piazza dei Crociferi. Due to several additions and modifications to the end-most points of the conduits during the years that followed, during the Renaissance and Baroque periods, the Acqua Vergine culminated in several magnificent mostre - the  Trevi Fountain and the fountains of Piazza del Popolo.

Courses 
Beginning as rainwater falling on the Alban Hills to the east of Rome, then percolating through miles of volcanic tuff, the water springs forth in marshland approximately eight miles to the east of Rome off Via Collatina, in a small town called Salone. From the same source, but running different courses, two separate aqueducts emerge:

Acqua Vergine Antica, which travels underground through some of the same channels constructed by Agrippa's engineers, proceeds into Rome on the northeast under Via di Pietralata, at a point formerly called Fosso Pietralata, crosses Via Nomentana, flows westward toward and through the park of Villa Ada, passes under the western limits of the Villa Borghese, traverses the gardens of Villa Medici, descends the Pincio to Piazza di Spagna, extends under Renaissance Rome to burst forth into the Roman sky in the spectacular, baroque mostra on the Quirinal Hill, the fountain of Trevi.
Acqua Vergine Nuova, which travels into Rome from the northeast under Via Tiburtina, flows under the Pincio to Porta Pinciana, where it branches into 2 channels:
one passes southwest to link up, but not mingle, with Acqua Vergine Antica just behind Piazza di Spagna and descends the Pincio to emit its water through the fine, elegant sprays of its regal mostra, the lions of Piazza del Popolo
one passes northwest under Galoppatoio, curves through the Borghese Gardens, makes a sharp southerly turn toward Piazzale Flaminio to make its triumphant appearance in the triple-arch mostra cascading on the western slopes of the Pincio overlooking Piazza del Popolo.

Termini 
Today, as in days of old, the Acqua Vergine is regarded to furnish some of the purest drinking-water in Rome, reputed for its restorative qualities. Many people to this day can be seen filling containers for drinking and cooking in its splendid fountains, including:
Trevi Fountain
The fountains of Piazza del Popolo
 The Cascade on the Pincio
 The Lions of the central fountain
The Rome Group
The Pantheon fountain in Piazza della Rotonda 
The Colonna fountain in Piazza Colonna
The fountain of the Tortoises (Tartarughe) in Piazza Mattei
The fountain of Campo de' Fiori
The north and south fountains of Piazza Navona
 The Neptune Fountain
 The Moor fountain
The fountains of Piazza Venezia
Il Facchino (The Porter) in Via Lata
Fontana della Barcaccia in Piazza di Spagna
Il Babuino (The Baboon) in Via del Babuino.

References 

Aquae Urbis Romae: The Waters of the City of Rome, Dr. Katherine Wentworth Rinne
Katherine W. Rinne, "Between Precedent and Experiment: the Restoration of the Acqua Vergine (1560-1570)", in L. Roberts, S. Schaffer and P. Dear (eds.), The mindful hand: inquiry and invention from the late Renaissance to early industrialisation (Edita/University of Chicago Press: 2007), 95-115.
David Karmon, "Restoring the ancient water supply system in Renaissance Rome: the Popes, the civic administration, and the Acqua Vergine", in Waters of Rome, Occasional Papers (3), 2005

External links
Famous Fountains of Rome
The Fountains of Rome (by Region)
Famous Squares and Fountains of Rome

Buildings and structures completed in the 1st century BC
Buildings and structures completed in 1453
Fountains in Rome
Vergine
19 BC